The 2012–13 Fairfield Stags men's basketball team represented Fairfield University during the 2012–13 NCAA Division I men's basketball season. The Stags, led by second year head coach Sydney Johnson, played their home games at Webster Bank Arena and were members of the Metro Atlantic Athletic Conference. They finished the season 19–16, 9–9 in a tie for sixth place. They advanced to the semifinals of the MAAC tournament where they lost to Manhattan. They were invited to the 2013 CIT where they lost in the first round to Kent State.

Roster

Schedule

|-
!colspan=9| Exhibition

|-
!colspan=9| Regular season

|-
!colspan=9| 2013 MAAC men's basketball tournament

|-
!colspan=9| 2013 CIT

References

Fairfield Stags men's basketball seasons
Fairfield
Fairfield
Fairfield Stags men's basketball
Fairfield Stags men's basketball